Vişnezade is a neighborhood in İstanbul, Turkey. Vişne means "sour cherry" and the neighborhood is named after İzzeti Mehmet Efendi (1629-1681) an Ottoman statesman nicknamed Vişnezade who was known to cultivate sour cherry in the place of this neighborhood.

Beyoğlu ilçe is to the southwest, Sinanpaşa (Beşiktaş centrum) is to the north east and the Bosphorus is to the southeast.

The two of the most important structures are the Dolmabahçe Palace and the mosque which bears the name of the neighborhood.

References

Neighbourhoods of Beşiktaş
Bosphorus